Carlos Alberto Pires Tiny (born 1950) is a São Toméan politician. He finished in third place (3.26%), well behind the winner, Fradique de Menezes (over 55%) in the 2001 presidential election. In the 2006 elections, he was candidate for the MLSTP-PSD party in 2006 and represented the constituency of Água Grande. In 2008, Tiny became the Minister of Foreign Affairs & Cooperation for São Toméan.

He preceded Ovídio Manuel Barbosa Pequeno and was succeeded by Manuel Salvador dos Ramos

Carlos Tiny died on April 8th 2022

References

Sources
Gerard DeGroot, São Tomé And The Curse Of Oil. International Relations and Security Network, 12 March 2011, accessed on 9 November 2013

Living people
Foreign Ministers of São Tomé and Príncipe
1950 births
21st-century São Tomé and Príncipe politicians